Amfenac, also known as 2-amino-3-benzoylbenzeneacetic acid, is a nonsteroidal anti-inflammatory drug (NSAID) with acetic acid moiety.

See also
 Bromfenac (same structure as amfenac but with p-bromo)

References

Nonsteroidal anti-inflammatory drugs
2-Aminobenzophenones
Acetic acids